The 2002 Asian Men's Junior Handball Championship (8th tournament) took place in Bangkok from 21 August–31 August. It acts as the Asian qualifying tournament for the 2003 Men's Junior World Handball Championship in Brazil.

Draw

Preliminary round

Group A

Group B

Placement 5th–8th

7th/8th

5th/6th

Final round

Semifinals

Bronze medal match

Gold medal match

Final standing

References
www.handball.jp (Archived 2009-09-04)
www.asianhandball.com

International handball competitions hosted by Thailand
Asian Mens Junior Handball Championship, 2002
Asia
Asian Handball Championships